Ivan Lendl was the defending champion, but did not participate this year.

Tim Mayotte won the title, defeating John McEnroe, 3–6, 6–1, 6–3, 6–1 in the final.

Seeds

  Mats Wilander (second round)
  Jimmy Connors (quarterfinals)
  Brad Gilbert (second round)
  John McEnroe (final)
  Tim Mayotte (champion)
  Emilio Sánchez (third round)
  Tim Wilkison (third round)
  Eric Jelen (third round)
  Milan Šrejber (semifinals)
  Karel Nováček (quarterfinals)
  Jakob Hlasek (quarterfinals)
  Ramesh Krishnan (second round)
  Andrei Chesnokov (second round)
  Paul Annacone (quarterfinals)
  Slobodan Živojinović (second round)
  Amos Mansdorf (semifinals)

Draw

Finals

Top half

Section 1

Section 2

Bottom half

Section 3

Section 4

References

 Main Draw

U.S. Pro Indoor
1987 Grand Prix (tennis)